The Mingo people are an Iroquoian group of Native Americans, primarily Seneca and Cayuga, who migrated west from New York to the Ohio Country in the mid-18th century, and their descendants. Some Susquehannock survivors also joined them, and assimilated. The Mingo have also been called "Ohio Iroquois" and "Ohio Seneca".

Most were forced to move from Ohio to Indian Territory in the early 1830s under the federal Indian Removal program. At the turn of the 20th century, they lost control of communal lands when property was allocated to individual households in a government assimilation effort related to the Dawes Act and extinguishing Indian claims to prepare for the admission of Oklahoma as a state. 

In the 1930s, Mingo descendants reorganized as a tribe with self-government. They were recognized by the federal government in 1937 as the Seneca–Cayuga Tribe of Oklahoma.

History

The etymology of the name Mingo derives from the Delaware (Lenape) word,  or Minque, as adapted from their Algonquian language, meaning "stealthy". In the 17th century, the terms Minqua or Minquaa were used interchangeably to refer to the five nations of the Iroquois League and to the Susquehannock, another Iroquoian-speaking people. 

The Mingo had a bad reputation and were sometimes called "Blue Mingo" or "Black Mingo" for their misdeeds. The people who became known as Mingo migrated to the Ohio Country along the river in the mid-eighteenth century, part of a movement of various Native American tribes away from European pressures to a region that had been sparsely populated for decades but controlled as a hunting ground by the Iroquois League of the Five Nations. The "Mingo dialect" that dominated the Ohio valley from the late 17th to early 18th centuries is considered a variant most similar to the Seneca language.

After the French and Indian War (1754-1763), France was defeated and ceded its lands east of the Mississippi River to Great Britain. Many Cayuga people of the Five Nations also moved to Ohio, where the British granted them a reservation along the Sandusky River. They were joined there by the Algonquian-speaking Shawnee of Ohio and the rest of the Mingo confederacy. Their villages were increasingly an amalgamation of Iroquoian-speaking Seneca, Wyandot, and Susquehannock; Siouan-language speaking Tutelo and Algonquian-language Shawnee and Delaware migrants.

Although the Iroquois Confederacy had claimed hunting rights and sovereignty over much of the Ohio River Valley since the late 17th century, these peoples in Ohio increasingly acted independently. When Pontiac's Rebellion broke out in 1763 against the British at the end of the French and Indian War, many Mingo joined with other tribes in an attempt to drive the British out of the Ohio Country.  At that time, most of the six Iroquois nations based in New York (who then numbered six, as the Tuscarora had joined them from the South about 1722) were closely allied to the British because of their lucrative fur trading. Guyasuta (c. 1725–c. 1794), a chief of the Mingo-Seneca, was one of the leaders in Pontiac's War.

Another famous Mingo leader was Chief Logan (c. 1723–1780), who had good relations with neighboring white settlers. He was not a war chief, but a village leader. In 1774, as tensions between whites and Indians were on the rise due to a series of violent conflicts, a band of white outlaws murdered his family.  Local chiefs counseled restraint, but acknowledged his right to revenge. He conducted a series of raids against white settlers with a dozen followers, not all of whom were Mingo.

Logan did not participate in the resulting Lord Dunmore's War. He was not likely to have been at the climactic Battle of Point Pleasant. Rather than take part in the peace conference, he expressed his thoughts about the encroachment by Europeans in "Logan's Lament."  His speech was printed and widely distributed. It is one of the most well-known examples of Native American oratory.

By 1830, the Mingo were flourishing in western Ohio, where they had improved their farms and established schools and other civic institutions.  After the US passed the Indian Removal Act in that same year, the government pressured the Mingo to sell their lands and migrate west of the Mississippi River to Kansas, which they did in 1832. In Kansas, the Mingo joined other Seneca and Cayuga bands, and the tribes shared the Neosho Reservation.

In 1869, after the American Civil War, the US government pressed for Indian removal of these tribes from Kansas to Indian Territory (present-day Oklahoma).  The three tribes moved to present-day Ottawa County, Oklahoma. In 1881, a band of Cayuga from Canada joined the Seneca in Indian Territory. In 1902, several years before Oklahoma Territory was admitted as a state, 372 members of the joint tribe received individual land allotments under a federal program to extinguish communal tribal land holdings so that statehood could take place, and to encourage assimilation to the European-American model. This resulted in considerable loss of their lands in the following decades.

In 1937 after the Oklahoma Indian Welfare Act was passed, the descendants of these tribes reorganized to re-establish self-government. They identified as the Seneca-Cayuga Tribe of Oklahoma and became federally recognized. 

Today, the tribe numbers over 5,000 members. They continue to maintain cultural and religious ties to the Six Nations of the Iroquois, which have been based largely in Ontario, Canada since after the American Revolutionary War. At the time, Great Britain ceded its territory south of the Great Lakes and east of the Mississippi River to the newly independent American states, including most of the lands controlled by the Iroquois in New York and Pennsylvania. Some of the Six Nations also have bands with reservations in New York State, their original homeland. In the US, these governments are recognized as separate tribes.

In popular culture
Logan and the Mingo in the period following Lord Dunmore's War are featured prominently in the Gothic novel Logan (1822) by John Neal. The story can be read as issuing an indictment of American imperialism by depicting Indigenous genocide as central to the American story.

References

Citations

Sources
Cobb, William H., Andrew Price and Hu Maxwell (1921), History of the Mingo Indians, Cumberland, Md.: F.B. Jenvy, printer.
Hoxie, Frederick E., editor (1996), Encyclopedia of North American Indians. Boston, MA: Houghton Mifflin,  pp. 380–381. .
McConnell, Michael N. (1992), A Country Between The Upper Ohio Valley and Its Peoples, 1724–1774. Lincoln, Nebraska: University of Nebraska Press, .

Algonquian ethnonyms
Iroquois
Native American tribes in Ohio
Native American tribes in Kansas
Native American tribes in Oklahoma
Native American tribes in West Virginia
Native Americans in the American Revolution
Seneca tribe
Susquehannock